Langevåg Idrettslag is a sports club located in Langevåg, Sula, Norway. It has sections for association football, team handball and electric floorball.

Football
Langevåg played their first game on Langevåg Stadion in 1921. In 1961, the team played play-offs for promotion to Hovedserien, the Norwegian top division, but lost 3–4 on aggregate against Steinkjer. 7,700 spectators attended the home game, which is the attendance record at Langevåg Stadion. 

The men's football team currently plays in 4. divisjon, the fifth tier of the Norwegian football league system, since their promotion from the sixth tier in 2019. They last played in the 2. divisjon (third tier) in 2002 and 2003.

Norwegian international, Cecilie Fiskerstrand has played for the club.

Recent seasons
{|class="wikitable"
|-bgcolor="#efefef"
! Season
!
! Pos.
! Pl.
! W
! D
! L
! GS
! GA
! P
!Cup
!Notes
!
|-
|2012
|4. divisjon
|align=right bgcolor="#FFCCCC"| 12
|align=right|22||align=right|5||align=right|3||align=right|14
|align=right|28||align=right|48||align=right|18
|
| Relegated to 5. divisjon
|
|-
|2013
|5. divisjon
|align=right bgcolor=#DDFFDD| 1
|align=right|18||align=right|15||align=right|3||align=right|0
|align=right|67||align=right|23||align=right|48
|dnq
| Promoted to 4. divisjon
|
|-
|2014
|4. divisjon
|align=right|9
|align=right|22||align=right|7||align=right|6||align=right|9
|align=right|37||align=right|50||align=right|27
|dnq
|
| 
|-
|2015
|4. divisjon
|align=right|9
|align=right|22||align=right|7||align=right|5||align=right|10
|align=right|49||align=right|50||align=right|26
|dnq
| 
|
|-
|2016
|4. divisjon
|align=right|2
|align=right|22||align=right|13||align=right|5||align=right|4
|align=right|68||align=right|29||align=right|44
|dnq
|
|
|-
|2017
|4. divisjon
|align=right bgcolor="#FFCCCC"| 11
|align=right|22||align=right|6||align=right|1||align=right|15
|align=right|31||align=right|64||align=right|19
|First qualifying round
|Relegated to 5. divisjon 
|
|-
|2018
|5. divisjon
|align=right|3
|align=right|22||align=right|13||align=right|5||align=right|4
|align=right|69||align=right|31||align=right|44
|dnq
|
|
|-
|2019
|5. divisjon
|align=right bgcolor=#DDFFDD| 1
|align=right|22||align=right|15||align=right|3||align=right|4 
|align=right|72||align=right|33||align=right|48 
|dnq
|Promoted to 4. divisjon 
|
|}

References

External links
Official site (in Norwegian)

1920 establishments in Norway

Football clubs in Norway
Association football clubs established in 1920
Sport in Ålesund